Jason "Spicy G" Goldman, known professionally as Spicy G, is an American music producer, songwriter, arranger, multi-instrumentalist, and educator. He co-produced Michael Buble's Grammy Nominated, Juno winning, platinum selling 2016 album Nobody But Me and co-wrote the lead single "Nobody But Me".

Early life
Goldman grew up in Norwalk, Connecticut, and took up the saxophone at the age of 11 after being inspired by his father, who was an R&B saxophonist in his youth. Goldman attended the Berklee College of Music, concentrating on jazz composition and film scoring. In 1998, he moved to Los Angeles and was selected by Herbie Hancock and Wayne Shorter to be a member of the Thelonious Monk Institute of Jazz. He has performed with Herbie Hancock, Terence Blanchard, Christian McBride, Clark Terry, Jimmy Heath, Roy Haynes, Kenny Barron, and Wayne Shorter.

Goldman received a master's degree from the University of Southern California in 2002, then began teaching there as an adjunct professor and Director of Jazz at the Los Angeles County High School for the Arts.

Career
In 2003, Goldman was selected by record producer David Foster to be the featured saxophonist in Michael Bublé's first touring band. While on Bublé's first global tour, Goldman began writing arrangements for the eight-piece band, including his takes on "Mack the Knife"  on Bublé's "Come Fly With Me" DVD (2004) and Charlie Chaplin's "Smile" on the CD/DVD combo Caught in the Act (2005).

Before leaving the band in 2005, Goldman was asked by Foster to arrange "Let It Snow" for Bublé's Radio City Music Hall debut. Goldman's arrangement was released on the platinum selling album Let It Snow in 2007.

Goldman co-produced Michael Bublé's 2016 album Nobody But Me, which debuted on the Billboard Top 200 at No. 2. He arranged and orchestrated the big band songs on the album including "I Wanna Be Around", "My Kind of Girl", and "My Baby Just Cares for Me". He also wrote two songs on the album, "Take You Away" and the lead single "Nobody But Me".

In September 2016, Goldman signed a music publishing deal with Reservoir Publishing.

Teaching
Goldman is an associate professor of Practice and Chair of the Jazz Studies department at the University of Southern California, where he has been a faculty member since 2002. He is also the artistic director of the Nonprofit Young Musicians Project, which he founded in 2009.

Young Musicians Project (YMP)

In 2009 Goldman started a charitable nonprofit organization called the Young Musicians Project to provide inner-city schools and after school programs free in-school and web clinics on various topics in the music industry.

Works 
In 2012 Goldman was hired by publishing company Radnofsky/Couper to write a jazz improvisation book. The Goldman Method is a systematic approach to jazz improvisation.

Discography
As Leader/Co-Leader
 2001 – The Definitive Standard
 2008 – Wave Street Sessions
 2020 - Hypnotized
 2022 - There's Only One

As arranger
 2003 – Come Fly with Me – Michael Bublé
 2005 – Caught in the Act – Michael Bublé
 2006 – Let It Snow – Michael Bublé
 2016 - Tony Bennett Celebrates 90 - Tony Bennett
 2016 - California Christmas - Jessy J
2018 - Love - Michael Bublé
2020 - Hypnotized - Jason 'Spicy G' Goldman
2022 - Higher - Michael Bublé
2022 - There's Only One - Jason 'Spicy G' Goldman & Lia Booth
2022 - The Music of a Charlie Brown Christmas - Doc Watkins
2022 - California Christmas vol. 2 - Jessy J

As producer/co-producer
 2016 – Nobody But Me – Michael Bublé
 2016 – Take You Away – Michael Bublé
2018 - Love - Michael Bublé (Bonus track)
2020 - Hypnotized - Jason 'Spicy G' Goldman
 2021 - Let It Snow (single) Christmas 10th Anniversary - Michael Bublé
 2022 - Higher - Michael Bublé
 2022 - There's Only One - Jason 'Spicy G' Goldman & Lia Booth
 2022 - The Music of a Charlie Brown Christmas - Doc Watkins

Other appearances
 2011 - Reminiscence - Mann featuring Ty Dolla $ign and Jason Goldman

References

External links
 www.jasongoldmanmusic.com
 The Young Musicians Project
 Jason Goldman, Faculty, USC Thornton School of Music
 Alumni, Thelonious Monk Institute of Jazz.

American jazz saxophonists
American male saxophonists
American music educators
Berklee College of Music alumni
Living people
Musicians from Norwalk, Connecticut
USC Thornton School of Music alumni
1975 births
21st-century American saxophonists
Jazz musicians from Connecticut
21st-century American male musicians
American male jazz musicians